The 2012 Interprovincial Hurling Championship, known as the 2012 M Donnelly Hurling Interprovincial Championship due to the tournament's sponsorship by businessman Martin Donnelly, is the 83rd series of the Interprovincial Championship. The annual hurling championship between the four historic provinces of Ireland is contested by Connacht, Leinster, Munster and Ulster. The championship was won by Leinster.

Participants
The teams involved are:

Results

Interprovincial Championship

Top scorers

Championship

Single game

Media coverage
None of the Interprovincial Championship semi-finals of final were broadcast live on television, however, brief highlights of all three games were shown on TG4's GAA 2012 highlights programme.

External links
 M Donnelly Interprovincials official website

Railway Cup Hurling Championship
Interprovincial Hurling Championship
Hurling